Irvin Faust (June 11, 1924 – July 24, 2012) was an American author and educator. He was born in Brooklyn, New York to Morris and Pauline Faust and grew up in Queens, New York and attended the Queens College of the City of New York (now known as the Queens College of the City University of New York) and the City College of New York (now known as  the City College of the City University of New York), where he earned a B.S. degree in 1949. Faust attended Columbia University for graduate studies, earning an M.A. in 1952 and an Ed.D in 1960. From 1943 to 1946, Faust served with the U.S. Army during and after World War II. He served with the Army in Europe and the South Pacific. Faust married Jean Satterthwaite in 1959.

Career

Faust was born to a Jewish family in Brooklyn, New York, the son of Morris and Pauline (née Henschel) Faust. Faust has also maintained a career in education. He has served as a teacher and guidance counselor at junior high and high schools. Faust also taught at Swarthmore College, Columbia University, and the University of Rochester. For many years he was the Director of Guidance  at Garden City High School (New York), Garden City, NY.

Author

Faust is best known for his novels and collections of short stories. In 1965, Eliot Fremont-Smith in The New York Times cited "Roar Lion, Roar" on a list of 14 books that constituted "new fiction read, reviewed and enjoyed during the year." His first novel, The Steagle, was made into a film in 1971. In all Faust wrote seven novels, two books of short stories and a number of uncollected short stories for various publications.  His ill health reduced his writing in his later  years, but he published a short story in 2008.

Death

Faust died from pneumonia following a series of strokes.

Selected bibliography
 Entering Angel’s World non-fiction (1963)
 Roar Lion, Roar and Other Stories short stories (1965)
 The Steagle novel (1966)
 The File on Stanley Patton Buchta novel (1970)
 Willy Remembers novel (1971)
 Foreign Devils novel (1973)
 A Star in the Family novel (1975)
 Newsreel novel (1980)
 The Year of the Hot Jock and Other Stories short stories (1985)
 Jim Dandy novel (1994)

References

External links
 Biography of Irvin Faust at the Biography Resource Center.
 Review of "Jim Dandy" by Irvin Faust at Entertainment Weekly.
 Article on Irvin Faust's work at The Neglected Books Page.

1924 births
2012 deaths
American educators
United States Army personnel of World War II
United States Army soldiers
20th-century American novelists
Teachers College, Columbia University alumni
City College of New York alumni
Jewish American novelists
American male novelists
Deaths from pneumonia in New York (state)
20th-century American male writers
21st-century American Jews